Mumtaz Mahal (1921  1945) was a British Thoroughbred racehorse who the National Sporting Library's Thoroughbred Heritage website says was "one of the most important broodmares of the 20th Century".

Background
She was named after empress Mumtaz Mahal, wife of Mughal Empire ruler Shah Jahan of Taj Mahal fame. Bred by Lady Sykes at her Sledmere Stud in Driffield, East Riding of Yorkshire, Mumtaz Mahal was out of the mare Lady Josephine. Her sire was The Tetrarch, whom the Thoroughbred Heritage website also said was "probably the greatest two-year-old of all time", and that he was "possibly the greatest runner ever."

Racing career

Prepared by trainer Richard Dawson at Whatcombe Stables in Wantage, Oxfordshire, at age two all of Mumtaz Mahal's races were at distances of either five or six furlongs. Quickly dubbed "The Flying Filly" because of her blazing speed, she set a new track record in the Spring Stakes at Newmarket Racecourse as part of her five important wins in 1923. In her last race that year, she finished second in the Imperial Produce Stakes on a track heavy with mud. At three Mumtaz Mahal finished second in her first distance test, the 1924 1,000 Guineas, and was fifth in the Coronation Stakes. Her handlers then entered her only in sprint races; she won the six-furlong King George Stakes and the five-furlong Nunthorpe Stakes.

Breeding record
Retired to breeding duties at the Aga Khan III's Sheshoon Stud at the Curragh in County Kildare, Ireland, Mumtaz Mahal became an important broodmare. Mumtaz Mahal's best racing son was Mirza II; he (like her) raced his best at distances of six furlongs or less but his trainer, Frank Butters, said he was the fastest horse he had ever conditioned.

Mumtaz Mahal's daughter Mumtaz Begum was bred to Nearco to produce Nasrullah, the sire of Bold Ruler who in turn sired Secretariat. Among Mumtaz Mahal's other descendants are Royal Charger, Petite Etoile, Abernant, and Shergar.

After foaling four foals in England (including Mah Mahal), Mumtaz Mahal was sent to the Aga Khan's Haras Marly-la-Ville stud farm in Marly-la-Ville, Val-d'Oise, France. There she had five more foals, including Mumtaz Begum and Mirza II. She died there in 1945 at the age of 24.

Pedigree

See also

Aga Khan III
Richard C. Dawson
The Tetrarch

References

1921 racehorse births
1945 racehorse deaths
Racehorses bred in the United Kingdom
Racehorses trained in the United Kingdom
Thoroughbred family 9-c